The 2018 Asian Indoor Athletics Championships was the eighth edition of the international indoor athletics event between Asian nations. It took place at the Aftab Enghelab Complex in Tehran, Iran, between 1 and 3 February.

Kazakhstan topped the medal table, winning 12 medals including 7 gold, ahead of the host nation Iran, and Qatar.

Results

Men

Women

Medal table

Participating nations

References

Results
results

External links
Official Asian Athletics Association website

2018
Asian Indoor Championships
Indoor Championships
Sport in Tehran
International athletics competitions hosted by Iran
2018 in Iranian sport
February 2018 sports events in Iran